Walter E. Grauman (March 17, 1922 – March 20, 2015) was an American director of stage shows, films and television shows.

Early life
Grauman was born in Milwaukee, Wisconsin to Jacob and Irene Grauman, both children of German immigrants who married after settling in the United States. His father, Jacob Grauman, was president of a film distributing company.

In his early years, Grauman lived in Shorewood, Wisconsin, a suburb of Milwaukee, and later moved to Arizona where he attended the University of Arizona. He served for four years in the United States Army Air Forces flying 56 combat missions over Europe in a B-25  in the Twelfth Air Force and was awarded the Distinguished Flying Cross before moving to California, where his mother was living at the time.

Entertainment industry
After spending a few years running his own business, Grauman eventually took a job as stage manager at NBC's studios in Los Angeles. During his stint working at the network, he and relative (by marriage) Alan Armer developed a talent-show type program that proved popular, setting the mold for shows like Star Search and American Idol to follow.

In 1957, Grauman turned to films, directing "The Disembodied" for the "B film" division of Allied Artists Studios, which was headed by friend Walter Mirisch. Although he directed only six theatrical films, Grauman had one of the most active and long lasting television careers in history which included work on such shows as The Untouchables, The Fugitive, Route 66, The Streets of San Francisco, The Twilight Zone and Murder, She Wrote. He also reportedly helped to get Michael Douglas one of his first jobs as a lead on The Streets of San Francisco.

Grauman directed 633 Squadron, a World War II film about a fictional squadron in the British RAF. In interviews, George Lucas has commented that he patterned the "trench run" sequence in his Star Wars: Episode IV on a scene from this film. (See the article on 633 Squadron for more information.)

Grauman also directed a number of made-for-TV films, including the Aaron Spelling produced 1970 supernatural horror film Crowhaven Farm.  Broadcast as an ABC Movie of the Week on 24 November 1970 and starring Hope Lange and Paul Burke, the film involves witchcraft, déjà vu, death, betrayal, revenge, and reincarnation, and it has become a cult classic.

Grauman was the creator/executive producer of the Los Angeles Spotlight Awards (not to be confused with the Spotlight Awards (GDC) for game developers), which are run through the Los Angeles Music Center. He was among the closest living relatives to Sid Grauman, owner and founder of Los Angeles' famous Grauman's Chinese Theater, Egyptian Theater and Million Dollar Theater. At the time of his death in 2015 at the age of 93, he resided in Los Angeles with his wife.

Directorial credits, theatrical films
The Disembodied (1957) Allied Artists
Lady in a Cage (1964) Paramount Pictures
633 Squadron (1964) Mirisch/United Artists
A Rage to Live (1965) Mirisch/UA
I Deal in Danger (1966) 20th Century Fox
The Last Escape (1970) Mirisch/UA

Pilots and television series

 Columbo
 The Untouchables
 The Fugitive (pilot)
 The Streets of San Francisco (pilot)
 Barnaby Jones (pilot)
 East Side/West Side
 Naked City
 The New Breed (pilot)
 Route 66
 Blue Light
 Honey West (pilot)
 Manhunter (pilot)
 Most Wanted (pilot)
 Quinn Martin's Tales of the Unexpected (episode "No Way Out")
 Bare Essence (pilot)
 Harrigan & Son (pilot)
 Scene of the Crime (pilot)
 Murder, She Wrote (53 one-hour episodes)
 Blacke's Magic (episode "Vanishing Act")

Plus over 275 30-minute and 1-hour filmed dramatic programs, including:

 V
 Trapper John, M.D.
 Twelve O'Clock High
 The Eleventh Hour
 Lancer
 Hotel de Paree
 Man Without a Gun
 Colt .45
 Cover Up
 Steve Canyon
 Peter Gunn
 Blue Light
 Burke's Law
 The June Allyson Show
 Empire

Live television drama
 80 Matinee Theater one-hour programs
 Alcoa Theatre
 The Philco Television Playhouse

Director/creator/executive producer
 Blue Light - series, ABC
 Felony Squad - series, ABC
 The Silent Force - series, ABC
 Six Movies-of-the-Week, ABC
 World Premiere, NBC
 Eleven two-hour movies, CBS

Movies for television and mini-series
 The Forgotten Man - Director/Producer/Creator
 Daughter of the Mind - Director/Executive Producer
 Crowhaven Farm - Director/Producer
 The Old Man Who Cried Wolf - Director/Producer
 Dead Men Tell No Tales - Director/Executive Producer
 Paper Man - Director/Executive Producer
 They Call It Murder - Director/Executive Producer
 Nightmare on the 13th Floor - Executive Producer/Director

Movies for television and mini-series - director

 Are You in the House Alone? - 2 hr
 Crisis in Mid-air - 2 hr
 The Golden Gate Murders - David Janssen/Susannah York, 2 hr, CBS
 Irwin Shaw's Top of the Hill - Wayne Rogers, 4 hr
 The Memory of Eva Ryker- Natalie Wood, 3 hr, CBS
 Pleasure Palace - Omar Sharif, José Ferrer, 2 hr, CBS
 Outrage! - 2 hr, CBS
 Force Five - 2 hr, ABC
 Covenant - José Ferrer, 2 hr, NBC

CBS movies and mini-series - director/producer
 To Race the Wind - Steve Guttenberg - 2 hr, CBS
 Jacqueline Susann's Valley of the Dolls, 1981 - 5 hr, CBS
 Bare Essence - 2 hr, CBS
 Illusions - 2 hr, CBS
 Who is Julia? - 2 hr, CBS
 Shakedown on Sunset Strip - 2 hr, CBS

References

External links

Interview of Walter Grauman at Directors Guild of America website 

American film directors
American television directors
American people of German descent
Artists from Milwaukee
1922 births
2015 deaths
United States Army Air Forces personnel of World War II
United States Army Air Forces officers
Recipients of the Distinguished Flying Cross (United States)
Burials at Westwood Village Memorial Park Cemetery
Action film directors